This is an overview of the progression of the Dutch track cycling record of the women's team pursuit.

The women's 3000m team pursuit track cycling discipline was introduced by the UCI at the 2007–08 track cycling season. The Dutch team consisting of Ellen van Dijk, Marlijn Binnendijk and Yvonne Hijgenaar rode the team pursuit for the first time at round 4 at the 2007–08 UCI Track Cycling World Cup in Copenhagen in a time of 3:36.901 (49.792 km/h). They broke the record later that day. After have ridden the team pursuit for the first time, the record has been broken nine times. Ellen van Dijk is the only woman who always has been part of the squad when a record was broken. The current record was settled during the 2012 Summer Olympics by Ellen van Dijk, Kirsten Wild and Vera Koedooder in a time of 3:20.013 (53.996 km/h) on 4 August 2012. After the 2011–12 track cycling season the UCI changed the discipline into a 4000 m team pursuit with 4 riders.

Progression

3000 m team pursuit with three riders (2007–2012)

4000 m team pursuit with four riders (from 2012)
After 2012 Ellen van Dijk stopped riding on the track, focussing on the road. Because Van Dijk was the most important rider for the team and because the team needs an addition rider, the national coach and technical director decided not to have a Dutch women's team pursuit team. For that reason there is not yet an official 4000 m team pursuit national record.

See also
 Dutch records in track cycling

References

Track cycling
Dutch record progression
Women's team pursuit (track cycling)